The Jefferson County School District is a public school district in Jefferson County, Georgia, United States, based in Louisville. It serves the communities of Avera, Bartow, Keysville, Louisville, Stapleton, Wadley, and Wrens.

Schools
The Jefferson County School District has two elementary schools, one middle school, and one high school.

Elementary schools 
 Carver Elementary School
 Wrens Elementary School

Middle schools
 Jefferson County Middle School

High school
 Jefferson County High School

Academy
 Louisville Academy

References

External links

School districts in Georgia (U.S. state)
Education in Jefferson County, Georgia